Steven Jay Blum (born April 29, 1960) is an American voice actor. Known for his distinctively deep voice, his most well-known roles include Spike Spiegel from the anime series Cowboy Bebop, Garazeb Orrelios from the animated series Star Wars Rebels, Wolverine from various Marvel projects, TOM (Toonami Operations Module) as the second and current host of Toonami and the current host of Toonami Latin America (2000–2008; 2012–present), Terence and Bomb on Angry Birds Live Action and Sub-Zero from the video game franchise Mortal Kombat.

He is sometimes credited as David Lucas, Richard Cardona, Roger Canfield, Tom Baron and Daniel Andrews in various anime and other live-action appearances.

Early life
Steven Jay Blum was born on April 29, 1960 to a Jewish family in Santa Monica, California.

Career

Blum began his career in 1992. His credits include the voice of Spike Spiegel in Cowboy Bebop, Zeb Orrelios in Star Wars Rebels, Mugen in Samurai Champloo, Roger Smith from The Big O, Orochimaru and Zabuza Momochi in Naruto and Wolverine in multiple Marvel productions. In video games, he provided the voice of main protagonist Jack Cayman in MadWorld, Tank Dempsey in the Call of Duty series, Professor Galvez in Metal Gear Solid: Peace Walker, Ares in God of War and God of War: Ascension, main protagonist Grayson Hunt in Bulletstorm, Brimstone in Valorant, Zoltun Kulle in Diablo III, Sub-Zero in Mortal Kombat X and 11, Hal Jordan / Green Lantern in Injustice 2, Rytlock Brimstone in Guild Wars 2, and main protagonist Capt. Devin Ross in Clive Barker's Jericho.

In September 2000, Blum voiced TOM, the robotic host of Cartoon Network's Toonami programming block. He replaced Sonny Strait in the character's subsequent appearances, until the cancellation of Toonami in 2008. When Toonami was revived on March 31, 2012, he returned as the voice of TOM. He is also the announcer for 7-Eleven's "Oh Thank Heaven" television and radio advertisements and partnered with Vic Mignogna in the series Real Fans of Genius (a parody of Anheuser-Busch's Real Men of Genius radio ad campaign). 

In animation, he is the voice of Heatblast, Ghostfreak and Vilgax in the Ben 10 franchise, Starscream in Transformers: Prime, Count Vertigo in DC Showcase: Green Arrow and Young Justice, Red Skull, Beta Ray Bill and Wolverine in Wolverine and the X-Men and The Avengers: Earth's Mightiest Heroes and Amon in The Legend of Korra.

On June 5, 2012, he was awarded a Guinness World Record for being the most prolific video game voice actor, having 261 credited appearances as of May 10, 2012.

Personal life
Blum married voice actress Mary Elizabeth McGlynn in 2017. He has three sons from a prior relationship. One of them, Brandon, is also an actor, while another, Jeremy, is a teacher.

Filmography

Anime

Animation

Live-action television

Film

Video games

Audio books

Other

Notes

References

Books cited

External links

 
 
 
 
 

1960 births
Living people
American male video game actors
American male voice actors
Cartoon Network people
California Democrats
Jewish American male actors
Jewish American writers
Male actors from Santa Monica, California
Audiobook narrators
20th-century American male actors
21st-century American male actors
21st-century American Jews